The Regional Connector Transit Project is a transit project currently constructing a  light rail tunnel for the Los Angeles Metro Rail system in Downtown Los Angeles. It is designed to connect the A Line and E Line, which currently end at 7th Street/Metro Center station, to the existing L Line and Union Station. When completed, the project will provide a one-seat ride into the core of Downtown for passengers on those lines who currently need to transfer, and it will reduce or eliminate transfers for many passengers traveling across the region via Downtown.

The project is being implemented by the Los Angeles County Metropolitan Transportation Authority (Metro). It has been given high priority by Metro in its long-range plan and has funding set aside in Measure R.

The draft environmental impact statement was completed in September 2010, selection of a preferred alternative was completed in late October 2010, and the Final Environmental Impact Report was certified on April 26, 2012. 

Pre-construction on the project began in December 2012. The contract for heavy construction on the project was signed on July 9, 2014, and its official groundbreaking was held on September 30, 2014.

Originally scheduled to open in 2020 but delayed due to construction difficulties, the project is 90% completed as of April 2022 with train testing commencing and revenue service expected to start in Spring 2023.

Route
The project's tunnels begin at the north end of 7th Street/Metro Center station, the previous terminal built in the early 1990s, and continue north under Flower Street. In Little Tokyo, the line turns off 2nd to serve the replacement underground Little Tokyo/Arts District station before the routes split to their own surface portals, connecting to former L Line tracks.

Station listing
The project will include three stations. From northeast to southwest, the stations are:

Little Tokyo/Arts District, located at 1st Street and Central Avenue, which replaces the former above-ground station of the same name
Historic Broadway, located at 2nd Street and Broadway
Grand Av Arts/Bunker Hill, located at 2nd Place and Hope Street

At previous points during planning and construction, Little Tokyo/Arts District was referred to as 1st St/Central; Historic Broadway as Los Angeles City Hall or 2nd Street/Broadway; and Grand Av Arts/Bunker Hill as Bunker Hill or 2nd Place/Hope Street.

Planned service plan
Metro plans to discontinue the L Line and use parts of its route to reconfigure the A and E Lines into the following:

It will become even longer upon completion of Phase 2B of the Gold Line Foothill Extension when it opens in early 2025.

Background
The connector was envisioned as early as 1984 when planning and building the Metro Blue Line and restudied with a through connection in the Pasadena Light Rail Corridor studies in 1989. LACMTA originally envisioned the Blue Line running through Downtown L.A. to Union Station and onward to Pasadena with potential future lines to the northwest (Burbank/Glendale) and to the south and west (Exposition Park/Santa Monica).  The connector was not completed due to lack of funds and realignment of the Red Line Eastside Extension, which later became an extension of the Pasadena Gold Line (the Gold Line was renamed the L line in 2019).

The connector was formally studied for the first time as a stand-alone project in a Major Investment Study in 1992–1993, in preparation of the Long Range Transportation Plan. The project was revived in 2004, when LACMTA staff initiated a technical feasibility assessment for a potential regional connector. This study focused on conceptual methods to provide a regional connector and to alleviate potential operational constraints.

The 2004 staff study looked at the potential alignments that would not be entirely underground, due to funding constraints from the voter-approved 1998 Prop A ban on local county subway funding.  Most of the alignments were under Flower Street, surfacing between 5th Street and 1st Street and proceeding east to Alameda Street, connecting to the Eastside light rail corridor (now part of the Metro L Line), and continuing either north toward Union Station and Azusa or east toward East Los Angeles.

LACMTA staff analyzed at-grade street-running couplets, transit mall, elevated and hybrid subway/at-grade/elevated alignments along east-west streets such as Temple Street, First Street, Second Street and Third Street and utilizing available grade-separated infrastructure such as the Second Street Tunnel through Bunker Hill (between Hill and Figueroa Streets) or the Third Street Tunnel (between Hill and Flower Streets) to minimize costs, improve operating times and improve the feasibility of constructing the project.

In July 2006, the LACMTA Board voted to approve funding and staff to initiate a Major Investment Study (MIS) for the Regional Connector in conjunction with approval of a similar study for the extension of the Red Line subway. In June 2007, the LACMTA Board approved the consultants to perform the Alternative Analysis and MIS, and in July 2007 the Alternatives Analysis was initiated. In November 2007, preliminary outreach meetings for the Alternative Analysis were held at Central Library and the Japanese American National Museum (JANM). The results from these meetings were presented to the public in February 2008, including the descriptions of the eight route alternatives identified for analysis, narrowed down to two later in 2008. At the January 2009 Metro Board Meeting, the Regional Connector was approved and received funding to continue in the environmental study process (Draft EIS/EIR).

Environmental review process

The Alternatives Analysis yielded two LRT (light rail) build alternatives, plus the required "No Build" and "TSM" (Transportation System Management) options. A third LRT build alternative was added in February 2010, at the request of Little Tokyo stakeholders (including property, business, and homeowners).

The operational intent of the project is to allow through running of service between the four corridors (Blue Line corridor, Expo corridor, Gold Pasadena corridor, and Gold Eastside corridor). All three build alternatives begin at the 7th St/Metro Center station, which is currently the northern terminus of the Blue Line and the eastern terminus of the Expo Line which opened on April 28, 2012. All three build alternatives connect to the existing Gold Line at Alameda Street near Temple Street or 1st Street.

On October 28, 2010, the LACMTA Board of Directors opted for a fully underground option, rejecting at-grade and underground emphasis alternatives. This route remains underground below Flower and 2nd Streets until northwest of 1st/Alameda. By that point, the route would have split into two branches. Each branch would then emerge from a tunnel - one heading north to Union Station, the other east to the Eastside.

Metro added this alignment in February 2010, after receiving public input on the other two options.  This option puts the connector underground beneath 1st/Alameda. The fourth new station (at 1st/Alameda southwest block) would replace the existing Little Tokyo/Arts District station. The third station (nearest the Civic Center) was shifted slightly west toward Broadway, to take advantage of redevelopment efforts in the historic core. This option is generally fastest and has fewest impacts during operations, but it would have more construction impacts and higher costs.

Comparison of alternatives
The following table summarizes key characteristics of each alternative:

Selected Alternative: LRT 3
In September 2010, Metro published the Draft Environmental Impact Statement/Environmental Impact Report (Draft EIS/EIR).  The report recommended adoption of the "Fully Underground LRT Alternative" (LRT 3 above).

In October 2010, Metro staff reaffirmed this recommendation, but with the 5th/Flower station removed. The report cited concerns for the overall project cost and the proposed station's short distance from Metro Center/7th Street Station, a mere three blocks, which might not have met FTA funding standards. However, proponents of a 5th/Flower station cited the high density of very large high-rise office buildings within one block of a 5th/Flower station and that such a station would relieve what is expected to be extreme pressure at Metro Center/7th Street (already experiencing pressure) once the Expo Line, then the Regional Connector are complete.

At the Metro Board meeting in late October 2010, the Board certified the Draft EIS/EIR and accepted the staff recommendation of Fully Underground Alternative with the 5th/Flower station deleted as the Locally Preferred Alternative (LPA). The project staff will now conduct a final study of the LPA, which will culminate in a Final Environmental Impact Study/Environmental Impact Report (Final EIS/EIR).

Project funding
Measure R guarantees the Regional Connector $160 million for implementation. In February 2014, the federal government granted Metro $670 million in New Starts funds and $160 million in infrastructure loans for the project.

Construction
Pre-construction activities began in December 2012, with the start of the relocation of utility pipes. Major heavy construction was scheduled to begin in 2013, but was delayed by lawsuits, among other factors. The main contractor was finally issued a "Notice to Proceed" in early July 2014; the official groundbreaking for heavy construction on the project was held on September 30, 2014.

Most sections of the Regional Connector tunnel will be built using the tunnel boring machine (TBM) construction method, though some sections (especially the locations of the three future subway rail stations) will be built using the cut-and-cover construction method with an emphasis on maintaining as much road access as possible during construction. Metro has an agreement with the Los Angeles Music Center to use the most advanced state of the art noise-suppression measures underneath 2nd Street where it passes Walt Disney Concert Hall and the Colburn School of Music. This commits Metro to use procedures to ensure that the rumble of trains does not intrude on the sound quality of recordings made in the venues or mar audiences' musical experience within this sensitive stretch of the tunnel.

Two modest, one-story brick buildings had to be demolished since the Little Tokyo/Arts District station will be moved underground and across the street. One of the structures existed since at least 1898 and both played an important role in the cultural life of the Little Tokyo neighborhood for decades.

By late 2017, one of the two tunnels had been completed; the second tunnel was completed in January 2018. Extra work and expense were required to work around century-old water and electric infrastructure beneath downtown Los Angeles. Metro has revised its estimate for the project completion to early 2023, more than two years after the original estimated completion date.

In 2020, due to the COVID-19 pandemic and the subsequent state-mandated closings of local businesses and stay-at-home orders that resulted in reduced traffic, the city of Los Angeles was able to shut down local roads, allowing Metro to accelerate construction. According to an independent monitoring report released by Metro in March 2020, at the current pace revenue service on the Regional Connector would begin in August 2022. In April 2022, Metro completed all trackwork as well as station platforms and system guideways with a planned opening date sometime in early 2023. The final part of work includes station plaza, street restoration, and fencing construction.

See also
 K Line
 D Line Extension
Other rail tunnels connecting previously disjointed systems
 Center City Commuter Connection (Philadelphia)
 Oslo Tunnel
Comparable light rail tunnels intended for capacity increases downtown
 D2 Subway
 Kombilösung Karlsruhe

References

External links

 Regional Connector Transit Project – official Metro website
 Los Angeles County Metropolitan Transportation Authority
 City of Los Angeles Office of the Mayor

Los Angeles Metro Rail projects
Proposed railway lines in California
Tram and light rail transit systems under construction
2023 in rail transport
Railroad tunnels in California